Hashcheh, also rendered Haitcha and Hashjeh, may refer to:
 Hashcheh-ye Makineh
 Hashcheh-ye Olya
 Hashcheh-ye Sofla